Olonets is a town and the administrative center of Olonetsky District of the Republic of Karelia, Russia, located on the Olonka River to the east of Lake Ladoga. Population:

History
Olonets is the oldest documented settlement in Karelia, mentioned by Novgorodian sources as early as 1137. Its history is obscure until 1649, when a fortress was built there to protect the Grand Duchy of Moscow against the Swedes. The same year it was granted town privileges. Until the Great Northern War, Olonets developed as a principal market for Russian trade with Sweden. To the south from the town, there sprawled a belt of fortified abbeys, of which the Alexander-Svirsky Monastery was the most important.

In the 18th century, Olonets' importance shifted from trade to ironworking industries. In 1773, it was made the seat of Olonets Governorate. Eleven years later, however, the seat was moved to Petrozavodsk and Olonets started to decline.

Modern Olonets is classified as a historical town of the Republic of Karelia and is the only town in the republic where Karelians are in majority (over 60% ).

Administrative and municipal status
Within the framework of administrative divisions, Olonets serves as the administrative center of Olonetsky District, under which it is directly subordinated. As a municipal division, the town of Olonets, together with eight rural localities, is incorporated within Olonetsky Municipal District as Olonetskoye Urban Settlement.

Notable people
 Walery Mroczkowski (1840-1889) was born in Olonets. He was an insurgent in the 1863 January Uprising. After prison, he was exiled and became a noted anarchist in Bakunin's close circle. Latterly, he worked as a photographer in France, using the pseudonym, ":Fr: Valerien Ostroga".
 Witold Pilecki (1901–1948) was born in Olonets. He was an army officer and a member of Armia Krajowa who got himself arrested in order to infiltrate the Nazi operation in Auschwitz concentration camp. He escaped from the camp and was one of the first direct witnesses of the Final Solution which he reported to his Underground superiors. He took part in the Warsaw Uprising. After WWII he was tried and executed by the Polish communist regime in 1948. He was a decorated Polish National hero.

International relations

Twin towns and sister cities
Olonets is twinned with:
 Hyrynsalmi, Finland
 Mikkeli, Finland
 Puolanka, Finland
 Ristijärvi, Finland

References

Notes

Sources

Cities and towns in the Republic of Karelia
Olonetsky District
Olonetsky Uyezd
Renamed localities of Karelia